Pen Pen, Pen-Pen, or Penpen may refer to:

Pen Pen TriIcelon, a video game released for the Sega Dreamcast
 Pen Pen (Neon Genesis Evangelion), a character in the Japanese anime Neon Genesis Evangelion and the movies Evangelion: Death and Rebirth and The End of Evangelion
The band of musicians headed by Filipino singer Emil Sanglay
Pen-pen de Sarapen, a 1978 song written by Filipino singer Emil Sanglay
Penpen de Sarapen, a variety show for children in the Philippines